The 1909–10 Columbia Lions men's soccer team was a soccer team that represented Columbia University as during the 1909–10 ISFL season. It was the program's fifth season as a varsity team, and their first under the "Lions" moniker, after previously being referred to as the "Blue and White". The program is best known for winning the university's first national soccer championship, being deemed the ISFL national champions at the conclusion of the season, compiling a record of five wins, no losses, and one draw across ISFL play. 

Today, they are recognized by American Soccer History Archives as the 1910 college soccer champions.

Schedule 

|-
!colspan=6 style=| Non-conference regular season
|-

|-

|-
!colspan=6 style=| ISFL
|-

Source:

References

External links 
 Columbia Men's Soccer Record Book

Columbia
Intercollegiate Soccer Football League Championship-winning seasons
Columbia Lions men's soccer seasons
Columbia
Columbia